Grand Avenue is a major east-west street in the city of Chicago and nearby DuPage County, although it deviates somewhat from Chicago's grid system, as it is diagonal west of Western Avenue. The street runs from the Kingery Highway (also known as U.S. Route 20 and Illinois Route 83) in Addison, east through the western suburbs, and then east-southeast into Chicago, through the Magnificent Mile shopping area, and continuing out to Navy Pier, where it ends. This is a distance of about 19 miles (31 km).

History
Grand Avenue was originally known as Whiskey Point Road, first used as a trail by the Miami, Illini and many other Native Nations, it leads to the West Side of Chicago, near Western Avenue. On the Near North Side it was called Indiana Street. Thomas Jefferson Vance Owen, Chicago's first town president, is believed to have named it in 1833 after naming Chicago, "a grand place to live."

Transit
Grand Avenue is serviced by many major CTA lines. The Blue Line stops at Grand at Halsted Street and Milwaukee Avenue; this stop is the first one north of The Loop. The Red Line also stops at Grand at State Street, close to the Magnificent Mile and Navy Pier. In 2007, the CTA began a renovation project at the station, which was completed in 2012. The 65 Grand bus route runs along Grand Avenue, from Nordica Avenue to Navy Pier. Pace bus route 319 serves Grand Avenue in Franklin Park, Elmwood Park, and Chicago, It runs from Grand/Nordica in Chicago, to Wolf Road/North Avenue in Northlake.

Major intersections

References 

Streets in Chicago